Federal Route 106, or Jalan Ajil-Kuala Berang, is a dual-carriageway federal highway in Terengganu, Malaysia.

The Kilometre Zero of the Federal Route 106 starts at Ajil.

At most sections, the Federal Route 106 was built under the JKR R5 road standard, allowing maximum speed limit of up to 90 km/h.

List of junctions and towns

References

Highways in Malaysia
Malaysian Federal Roads
Roads in Terengganu